Bertrand Edern Cozic (born 18 May 1978), known as Bertie Cozic, is a French former professional footballer who played as a midfielder.

Career
Born in Quimper, Finistère, Cozic first came to England with Team Bath F.C., the football team of the University of Bath, in 2002. After a successful first season, he moved into the professional game, having spells with Cheltenham (where he scored his first goal in professional football against Swansea City), Hereford, Northampton, Kidderminster and Aldershot, before returning to Team Bath in late 2005.

In the summer of 2006, Cozic transferred to Exeter City, following former University of Bath manager Paul Tisdale after he was newly named manager of Exeter City. He signed a new one-year contract with Exeter City in June 2009. He signed a new six-month deal with Exeter City in June 2010 with the option of a further six months. Cozic took up the option of a further six months contract in January 2011. He was also the owner of Gourmandine crepe-café on Catherine Street, Exeter until selling his share of the business in 2013 to take up a new venture in Food produce. Cozic announced his retirement from football in May 2011 to concentrate on his restaurant business, which his former club confirmed later that month.

On 8 July 2013, Cozic announced that he was coming out of retirement and would be signing a one-year deal with Tiverton Town. On 23 August it was announced that Cozic had been released by Tiverton after featuring just once as a substitute.

Career statistics

Notes and references

Cheltenham Town F.C. players
Hereford United F.C. players
Northampton Town F.C. players
Kidderminster Harriers F.C. players
Aldershot Town F.C. players
Exeter City F.C. players
National League (English football) players
English Football League players
1978 births
Living people
Team Bath F.C. players
Association football midfielders
French footballers
French expatriate footballers
Expatriate footballers in England